Telmatobius stephani is a species of frog in the family Telmatobiidae.
It is endemic to Argentina.
Its natural habitats are subtropical or tropical moist montane forest and rivers.
It is threatened by habitat loss.

References

stephani
Amphibians of the Andes
Amphibians of Argentina
Endemic fauna of Argentina
Taxa named by Raymond Laurent
Amphibians described in 1973
Taxonomy articles created by Polbot